William Wilson Webb (1826 - June 30, 1894) was an Ontario businessman and political figure. He represented Northumberland East in the Legislative Assembly of Ontario as a Liberal member from 1871 to 1874.

Webb was born near Colborne in Upper Canada, the son of an Irish immigrant. He was a merchant in Brighton and served as reeve of Brighton in 1864 and 1865.

External links 

Pioneer life on the Bay of Quinte, including genealogies of old families...
They Desired a Better Country, JWD Broughton''

1826 births
1894 deaths
Ontario Liberal Party MPPs